The Akan constituency is one of the constituencies represented in the Parliament of Ghana. It elects one Member of Parliament (MP) by the first past the post system of election. It is located in the Kadjebi district of the Oti Region of Ghana.

Boundaries
The constituency is located within the Kadjebi district of the Oti Region of Ghana. To the north is the Nkwanta South constituency in the Nkwanta District, to the west, the Krachi East in the Krachi East District, to the south the Jasikan District and to the east, the Ghana - Togo border. The constituency was originally located within the Volta Region of Ghana until new Regions were created following the December 2018 referendum.

Members of Parliament

Elections

See also
List of Ghana Parliament constituencies

References 

Parliamentary constituencies in the Oti Region